Kohneh Gurab (also Romanized as Kohneh Gūrāb) is a village in Rud Pish Rural District, in the Central District of Fuman County, Gilan Province, Iran. At the 2006 census, its population was 675, in 185 families.

References 

Populated places in Fuman County